Joseph Jean Gilles Tremblay (December 17, 1938 – November 26, 2014) was a Canadian ice hockey left winger who played his entire National Hockey League (NHL) career with the Montreal Canadiens from 1960 to 1969.  He played 509 games, scored 168 goals and added 162 assists before injuries led to his retirement at the age of 31. Tremblay was a member of four Stanley Cup championship teams with Montreal, in 1965, 1966, 1968, and 1969.

After his hockey player career, from 1971 to 1997, he worked as a French-language broadcaster for ice hockey; he won the 2002 Foster Hewitt Memorial Award for his work. Tremblay died of heart failure on November 26, 2014.

Career statistics

References

External links

1938 births
2014 deaths
Beauce Jaros players
Canadian ice hockey left wingers
Foster Hewitt Memorial Award winners
Ice hockey people from Quebec City
Montreal Canadiens announcers
Montreal Canadiens players
National Hockey League broadcasters
Stanley Cup champions